Pselnophorus jaechi is a moth of the family Pterophoridae. It is found locally around Mount Meru in Tanzania.

The moth flies in February, July and December.

References

External links 
 Ten new species of Afrotropical Pterophoridae (Lepidoptera)

Endemic fauna of Tanzania
Oidaematophorini
Mount Meru (Tanzania)
Moths of Africa
Moths described in 1993